Marmelo (plural: marmelos) may refer to:
 the Portuguese word for the fruit quince
 Marcelo Marmelo da Silva (born 1972), a Brazilian former football player
 Marmelos Zero Power Plant, a decommissioned hydroelectric power plant on the Paraibuna River in Juiz de Fora, Minas Gerais, Brazil
 Dos Marmelos River, a river of Amazonas state in north-western Brazil